Vija Vētra (born 6 February 1923) is a Latvian dancer and choreographer who is a leading classical Indian dancer. She has been based in the United States since 1964.

Biography

During World War II, she studied at the Vienna Academy of Music and Performing Arts, as well as the Vienna Conservatory Ballet chapter. 

In 1948, she emigrated to Australia, where in 1951 in Sydney opened a dance studio. Then, she moved to Germany. In 1967, she opened a dance study in New York City. She has danced ballet performances but mainly engaged in the Indian classical dances. 

From 1966 to 1975, she appeared in fourteen episodes of Mister Rogers' Neighborhood. 

Since 1990, she visits Latvia each year to teach classes and perform in concerts. 

In 1993, she founded the Unitarian Universalist church in Riga. She has been the subject of couple of documentaries: Vijaya (2004) and The World of Vija Vetra (2007).

Honours

In 1999, Vija Vētra received the Order of the Three Stars by the Latvian government.

Vētra turned 100 on February 6, 2023.

References 

1923 births
Living people
Dancers from Riga
Latvian emigrants to Austria
Latvian World War II refugees
Unitarian Universalists
Austrian emigrants to Australia
Austrian emigrants to Germany
German emigrants to the United States

Recipients of the Order of the Three Stars
Latvian centenarians
Women centenarians